Euzopherodes lutisignella is a species of snout moth in the genus Euzopherodes. It was described by Josef Johann Mann in 1869. It is found in Slovenia, Croatia, Albania, Greece, Turkey, Bulgaria, Romania, Russia and on Sicily. It has also been recorded from Kyrgyzstan.

References

Moths described in 1869
Phycitini
Moths of Europe
Moths of Asia